Gavin Castleton is a musician/songwriter/producer from Providence, Rhode Island. Originally known for his work with Gruvis Malt as keyboardist and singer, Castleton has released nine full-length albums and seven EPs as a solo artist. He has also released two full-length albums with action-adventure rock trio Ebu Gogo and two records with Orlando-based drum 'n bass hip-hop group One Drop. Castleton currently resides in Portland, Oregon.

History 

Castleton is a founding member of Rhode Island band Gruvis Malt, with whom he has released five full-length albums as well as a number of various independently-released EPs.

2006–2009

From 2006 to 2008 he recorded and toured in Ebu Gogo, releasing two full-length albums, Chase Scenes 1-14 and Worlds. The band consists of Castleton and two members of Gruvis Malt, Brendan Bell and Justin Abene, with Jonny Lingo drummer Chase Leonard sometimes sitting in for Bell on drums.

In 2006, Castleton collaborated with playwright Cyrus Leddy to release the bizarre spoken-word album Grace Land which chronicles the mundane life of Gary Tivoli, a clerk at a Staples store, including intimate details of his relationship with his girlfriend and his obsession with Seinfeld. Castleton performed the narration, which was adapted from a series of interviews that Leddy conducted with Tivoli.

Castleton has recorded and performed with several bands and musicians, including One Drop (with whom he recorded the Fortnightshift EP and One Drop's second full-length album, Of Love and Ambition), Paranoid Social Club, Club D'Elf, and Facing New York. He performed at the annual SXSW festival in 2007 and 2009, showcasing the Hospital Hymns EP and some material from Home.

In late 2007 he released A Bullet, A Lever A Key, the progressive hip hop EP that tells the story of an ever-deteriorating life in reverse-chronological order, beginning with his suicide in 2054 and ending backstage at a "present day" performance. His blog "The Great Consolidation" features entries from the future that expound on the storyline of A Bullet, A Lever, A Key and discuss his latest full-length album Home, the tale of a long term love affair interrupted by a zombie apocalypse.

On Halloween 2008 the first single from Home, "Unparallel Rabbits" was released digitally along with b-side, Gruvis Malt's "Since 1968" remixed by The Overclock Orchestra. On January 12, the second single from the album, "Coffeelocks", was released digitally along with b-side, "Shell". It enjoyed much airplay on KCRW's Morning Becomes Eclectic (and lead to a live performance on the show in 2009). On February 13 the full album was released digitally, and on April 7 it was released in stores nationwide.

On October 12, 2009, Five One Inc. released The Random Anthems EP on iTunes.  It contains three songs: Shell 2: Nephew of Shell (the sequel to Shell, produced by Zach Lipkins), Scared Scared Scared (previously released on the Japanese import of For the Love of Pete), and Hope is a Drug (produced by Overclock Orchestra). Hope is a Drug was Today's Top Tune at KCRW, and has enjoyed airplay on specialty radio shows around the country.

In Fall of 2009 he toured with a trio featuring Eduardo Torres on drums and Gray Robertson on bass, playing 67 self-booked shows criss-crossing the US. That tour also included a stint with Taking Back Sunday, Anberlin, and Fun, throughout which Castleton's trio was joined by members of Taking Back Sunday for the majority of his set.

2010–2011

On October 1, 2010, after a Kickstarter campaign, Gavin self-released Won Over Frequency, a collection of unreleased songs featuring Steve Choi, Matthew Fazzi, Keith Brush, Lex Land, Brandon Clemmens, Justin Abene, Steve Geuting, and several local Portland artists. Gavin posted a video of the album artwork-making process on his YouTube channel featuring the work of Aaron Nagel, Brendan Bell, Justin Muir, and Lorna Carman. In the Fall of 2010 the Castleton Trio toured to the east coast with Lex Land and Happy Body Slow Brain, who both joined him on stage throughout the show.

2012–2015

During the first half of 2012, Castleton focused mainly on releasing singles. Many were accompanied with a video, and were distributed via his blog, YouTube account, or various other media outlets. Some were related to his Won Over Frequency Kickstarter campaign, and were written to award certain individuals who made donations towards the completion of the album. On September 20, 2012 he performed live on Jimmy Fallon with the rapper Danny! and backed by the Roots.

Throughout 2013, Castleton kept a low profile. He performed live at SXSW (South by Southwest) Festival and released various singles in anticipation of his upcoming album. 

On April 23, 2014, Castleton released a 16-song "mixtape" called #blessed, available for free download on his bandcamp page with the purchase of any piece of apparel. In May he did a two-week tour around New England with Happy Body Slow Brain to promote the record. 

On October 11, 2014, Castleton released It Was the Worst of Times, It Was the Worst of Times, a five-song EP of "simple sad piano songs."

On December 25, 2014, Castleton released "Travelight," a narrative children's album inspired by The Little Prince, that featured songs written over the course of 10 years. It features Seth Castleton (Gavin's cousin) on cello, and Bob Castleton (Gavin's grandfather) as the narrator.

2015–2017

In the fall of 2015, Castleton toured as the keyboardist for Courtney Marie Andrews.

In October of 2015, Castleton released the Halloween single "Grady," a "sonic prequel" to The Shining.
 
In 2016, Castleton joined The Dear Hunter on keyboards and backing vocals. The new lineup was premiered abroad, during the band's U.K. tour in March 2016. He released an exclusive 4-song EP called "The Punchline EP" in conjunction with a 2-month major market US tour supporting The Dear Hunter and Eisley.

From June 8 to July 1, 2017, Castleton combined forces with Rare Futures to tour the US as the supergroup "FutureCastle," playing songs from both artists' catalogs. On June 2, 2017, they released the FutureCastle EP on limited edition vinyl, featuring four cover songs (including Castleton's arrangements of Chicago's "If You Leave Me Now" and Hall and Oates' "Maneater").

2018–present
On October 31, 2018, Castleton posted a lyric video for his Halloween single "I Choose You," inspired by the Teddy Perkins episode of Donald Glover's show Atlanta. 

On September 10, 2019, Castleton released Weak Intl., a 5-song micro-EP of "corporate clap-backs," on digital streaming platforms and bandcamp.com. The collection of 1-minute rants were inspired from Castleton's experience working in the tech industry. 

On October 16, 2019, Castleton released a #deathed, a compilation of his Halloween singles. He published a lyric video for his 2019 Halloween single, Pelle (a tribute to Ari Aster's horror/break-up film Midsommar).

On Nov 1, 2019, A Bullet, A Lever, A Key and Travelight were released on vinyl. For the month of November, Castleton performed select US dates as both the keyboardist and solo support act for The Dear Hunter.

On Dec 3, 2019, Castleton released the Red Poison EP, a collection of 5 songs penned by Castleton's step-daughter, Bloomer, over the course of two years (when she was aged 4 to 6 years old). The songs feature production and vocals by Castleton, as well as Bloomer's mother, Alexis Henry.

On Apr 23, 2020, Castleton released a full-length album, "Here You Go", on bandcamp.com.

On June 12, 2021, Castleton has left The Dear Hunter, citing being at a point in his life that he cannot "[contribute] the appropriate time, energy, and focus" that the "many amazing and ambitious TDH events and releases" would require.

Discography

Solo releases 

 Dark Age (2004)
 Hypotenuse (2004)
 FortNightShift (EP) (2005)
 Grace Land (2006)
 Hospital Hymns (EP) (2007)
 For The Love of Pete (2007)
 A Bullet, A Lever, A Key (EP) (2007)
 Window 23 w/ Stateless (7") (2008)
 Home (2009)
 Random Anthems EP (2009)
 Covers (compilation) (2009)
 Won Over Frequency (2010)
 "Covers (extended edition)" (2013)
 "#blessed Mixtape" (2014)
 Travelight (EP) (2014)
 It Was the Worst of Times, It Was the Worst of Times (EP) (2014)
 The Punchline (EP) (2016)
 The FutureCastle EP w/ Rare Futures (2017)
 Weak Intl. (Micro-EP) (2019)
 #deathed (compilation) (2019)
 Here You Go (2020)

Full discography 
A detailed list of every release Castleton has been a part of as either a songwriter, performer, engineer or producer.

References

External links 
 Gavin Castleton Web Site
 Gavin Castleton's blog 'The Great Consolidation'
 Gavin & Friends' Label Site 'Integers Only'
 Gavin Castleton Interview on ArmedReady.com
 

Musicians from Rhode Island
Living people
Year of birth missing (living people)
People from Providence, Rhode Island